US Route 95 (US 95) is a major north–south United States Highway in the western United States. It travels through the states of Arizona, California, Nevada, Oregon, and Idaho, staying inland from the Pacific Coast. US 95 begins in San Luis, Arizona, at the Mexican border, where Calle 1—a short spur—leads to Highway 2 in San Luis Río Colorado, Sonora. Its northern terminus is at the Canadian border in Eastport, Idaho, where it continues north as British Columbia Highway 95.

Unlike many other US Highways, it has not seen deletion or replacement on most of its length by an encroaching Interstate Highway corridor, due to its mostly rural and mountainous course. Because of this, it still travels from border to border and is a primary north–south highway in both Nevada and Idaho. This is one of the few US Routes to cross from Mexico to Canada.

Route description

Arizona

US 95 begins in the United States at the San Luis Port of Entry, which connects it with Mexico. It then follows the Colorado River northward to San Luis and on to Yuma, where it goes through town and crosses I-8. As it leaves Yuma, US 95 is an undivided two-lane highway that passes through the U.S. Army's Yuma Proving Ground.

It then travels northward between the proving ground to the west and the Kofa National Wildlife Refuge to the east until Quartzsite. Here, it merges with I-10 and runs concurrent, heading westward for  until the Colorado River, where it enters California, just shy of Blythe.

US 95 spends  in Arizona.

California

US 95 enters California at Blythe through its concurrency with I-10. It travels largely parallel to the west bank of the Colorado River until it joins I-40 in Needles. The route then travels north from Goffs to the Nevada state line.

It is the only US Highway to enter California but not terminate there.

Nevada

US 95 in Nevada is a divided highway between Cal-Nev-Ari (the SR 163 junction to Laughlin) and Boulder City. It joins at the interchange as a multi-lane divided freeway past SR 173 and as part of the concurrent route of I-11 and US 93 in Boulder City. Upon entering the Las Vegas Valley, I-11 ends at I-215 and SR 564; I-515 begins here in Henderson. It is also concurrent with I-515 and US 93 between Henderson and Downtown Las Vegas. It crosses I-15 at the Spaghetti Bowl, where I-515 ends and US 93 becomes concurrent with I-15. US 95 continues as a freeway until again becoming a divided highway at Corn Creek Road, northwest of the Las Vegas Valley.

Shortly after entering Nye County, US 95 becomes an undivided two-lane highway past the Mercury interchange, as it meanders northwestward through the state, roughly paralleling the California state line. Along this route, it runs through the Amargosa Valley, serving Beatty before heading north into Goldfield and Tonopah. The highway is concurrent with US 6 for several miles north of Tonopah, before it then heads north towards Hawthorne, Schurz (where it meets US 95 ALT, which heads northwest toward Yerington, Carson City—via US 50 west—Reno—via Ramsey Weeks Cutoff, US 50 east, SR 439 north, and I-80 west—and Fernley) and Fallon.

Oregon
In Oregon, US 95 is an undivided two-lane highway in the sparsely-populated high desert in the southeastern corner of the state, running completely in rural Malheur County. The highway heads north-northeastward to the Idaho state line, entering southwest of Marsing in Owyhee County.

US 95 is designated the I.O.N. Highway No. 456 (see Oregon highways and routes); "I.O.N." stands for Idaho–Oregon–Nevada. This section of highway is a primary commercial route between Boise and northern California, connecting to I-80 at Winnemucca, Nevada.

Idaho

As it proceeds north, US 95 crosses I-84 and US 30 before going through the Payette National Forest. Immediately after Riggins, the highway re-enters the Pacific Time Zone as it crosses the Salmon River. US 95 follows the descending river, then climbs over White Bird Hill to the Camas Prairie, then descends the Lapwai Canyon to the Clearwater River. In August 2015, milepost 420 was replaced with one reading 419.9 to prevent the sign from being stolen by marijuana enthusiasts.

US 95 becomes a four-lane divided highway after crossing the river east of Lewiston; it runs concurrent with US 12 for several miles. The highways split as US 12 continues west to Lewiston, and US 95 turns northwest and climbs a steep grade up to the rolling Palouse. At a junction with US 195, US 95 proceeds north to Moscow as a recently completed divided highway. It becomes an undivided highway in Moscow and continues north to Coeur d'Alene, crossing I-90. US 95 goes north to Sandpoint, where it joins with US 2, after which the highways run concurrent until after Bonners Ferry, where US 2 heads east to Montana, and US 95 continues north to Canada, meeting BC 95 at the Canadian border, at the Eastport-Kingsgate Border Crossing.

History

US 95 was one of the original U.S. highways proposed in the 1925 Bureau of Public Roads numbering plan. Under the original proposal, the highway would only exist in Idaho, from Payette to the Canada–US border north of Eastport. When the plan was adopted by the American Association of State Highway Transportation Officials in November 1926, the route of US 95 had been approved south to Weiser, still existing solely in Idaho. A proposal to extend US 95 south to Winnemucca, Nevada, was considered by AASHO in 1937; however, action was deferred due to sections in Oregon that were incomplete. AASHTO reconsidered the idea at its meeting on June 28, 1939, as part of a larger plan to extend the highway south to Blythe, California. This plan was adopted at that meeting and became effective on January 1, 1940.

Washington (former)

The route was moved to a new four-lane divided highway that bypassed Washington in October 1977. The section was replaced by an extension of US 195 and a spur route created in 1979.

Idaho

In April 2005, the Idaho legislature approved a bill to widen the entire highway from two lanes to four lanes for the entire route starting at the US-Canada port of entry in Eastport, and ending at the border with Oregon in remote Owyhee County. The contract for the project was awarded to Washington Group International and CH2M Hill.

The major factors in the reconstruction are due to the fact that US 95 is the only route that runs from north to south in western Idaho, starting at Eastport in the north and ending in remote Owyhee County; as well as safety concerns because there have been numerous accidents and fatalities on the narrow and very dangerous curves. This change started with the reconstruction and improvements made to White Bird Hill. Major projects have been undertaken including on the Coeur d'Alene Indian Reservation.

The second stage, from Fighting Creek Road to Lake Creek on the Coeur d'Alene Indian Reservation, was completed in late July-early August 2006 and upgraded a  stretch of the highway. The third stage, from Lake Creek to Worley, started mid-to-late 2006 and was completed in 2008. This section is significant, as it is on the Coeur d'Alene Indian Reservation. The "new" highway bypasses the Coeur d'Alene Casino, the largest business on the reservation, with the old highway becoming an alternate route that will connect the highway to the casino and the more remote regions of the reservation.

Future

Nevada

US 95 is part of a proposed northwestward extension of Interstate 11 (I-11) from Las Vegas. The interstate highway would primarily follow the US 95 corridor through central and northwestern Nevada, extending to I-80 near Reno and Sparks via Tonopah. In 2018, the Nevada Department of Transportation had initiated public outreach regarding its long-range planning efforts to narrow down options for the future I-11 corridor.

Major intersections
Arizona
 Calle 1 at the Mexico–US border in San Luis
  in Yuma
  in Quartzsite. The highways travel concurrently to Blythe, California.
California
  in Needles. The highways travel concurrently to west-northwest of Needles.
Nevada
  in Boulder City. The highways travel concurrently to Las Vegas.
  in Henderson
  in Henderson. The highways travel concurrently to Las Vegas.
  in Las Vegas
  in Tonopah. The highways travel concurrently to Coaldale.
  in Fallon. The highways travel concurrently through Fallon.
  south-southwest of Lovelock. The highways travel concurrently to Winnemucca.
Oregon
 No major intersections
Idaho
  southeast of Parma. The highways travel concurrently to north-northeast of Parma.
  south of Fruitland
  south of Fruitland. The highways travel concurrently to Fruitland.
  west of Spalding. The highways travel concurrently to Lewiston.
  north-northwest of Lewiston
  in Coeur d'Alene
  in Sandpoint. The highways travel concurrently to north-northeast of Bonners Ferry.
  at the Canada–US border in Eastport

See also
 U.S. Route 95 Spur
 U.S. Route 95 Alternate
 U.S. Route 95 Truck (unsigned Nevada SR 362)

References

External links

 Endpoints of U.S. Highway 95
 Washington Group/CH2M Hill Join Venture announcement of contract award.
 Floodgap Roadgap US 95 Vegas to Blythe

 
95
95
95